Scorpiops langxian is a species of scorpion in the family Euscorpiidae, first found in Tibet, China.

References

Further reading
Di, Zhi-Yong, et al. "The first record of the family Euscorpiidae (Arachnida: Scorpiones) from Central China, with a key of Chinese species of the genus Scorpiops." Euscorpius 2011.118 (2011): 1-9.
Di, Zhiyong, et al. "Notes on the scorpions (Arachnida, Scorpiones) from Xizang with the redescription of Scorpiops jendeki Kovařík, 2000 (Scorpiones, Euscorpiidae) from Yunnan (China)." ZooKeys 301 (2013): 51.

External links

Euscorpiidae
Arthropods of China
Endemic fauna of Tibet
Animals described in 2005